Theagenes may refer to:

 Theagenes of Megara (7th century BC), tyrant of Megara
 Theagenes of Rhegium (6th century BC), literary critic
 Theagenes of Thasos (5th century BC), Ancient greek boxer
 Theagenes of Thebes (died 338 BC), last commander of the Theban Sacred Band
 Theagenes of Patras (2nd century), Cynic philosopher
 Theagenes (patrician) (5th century), Athenian politician
 Theagenes (historian), historian of unknown date

Other uses 
 Theagenes, a protagonist from the Aethiopica
 Theagenes (butterfly), a genus of skipper butterflies